National Universities (국립대학교) in South Korea were established by the South Korean government to provide higher education for aiding the development of the country. Among all the universities in Korea, the most prestigious is Seoul National University.

Flagship Korean National Universities
Jeonbuk National University - Jeonju, North Jeolla
Chonnam National University - Gwangju
Chungbuk National University - Cheongju, North Chungcheong
Chungnam National University - Daejeon
Gyeongsang National University - Jinju, South Gyeongsang
Jeju National University - Jeju, Jeju
Kangwon National University - Chuncheon, Gangwon
Kyungpook National University - Daegu
Pusan National University - Busan
Seoul National University - Seoul

National Universities
Andong National University - Andong, North Gyeongsang
Changwon National University - Changwon, South Gyeongsang  
Gangneung-Wonju National University - Gangneung, Gangwon
Gyeongnam National University of Science and Technology - Jinju, South Gyeongsang
Hanbat National University - Daejeon
Hankyong National University - Anseong, Gyeonggi
Incheon National University - Incheon
Kongju National University - Gongju, South Chungcheong 
Korea Maritime and Ocean University - Busan 
Korea National University of Education - Cheongwon, North Chungcheong
Korea National University of Transportation - Chungju, North Chungcheong
Kumoh National Institute of Technology - Gumi, North Gyeongsang
Kunsan National University - Gunsan, North Jeolla  
Mokpo National Maritime University - Mokpo, South Jeolla
Mokpo National University - Mokpo, South Jeolla
Pukyong National University - Busan  
Seoul National University of Science and Technology - Seoul
Sunchon National University - Suncheon, South Jeolla

Special National Universities
Academy of Korean Studies - Seongnam, Gyeonggi
Armed Forces Nursing Academy, Daejeon 
National Cancer Center Graduate School of Cancer Science and Policy - Goyang, Gyeonggi
Korea National Sport University - Seoul
Korea National University of Arts - Seoul
Korea National University of Cultural Heritage - Buyeo, South Chungcheong
Korean National Police University - Asan, South Chungcheong
Korea Air Force Academy - Cheongju, North Chungcheong
Korea Military Academy - Seoul
Korea National Defense University - Seoul
Korea Army Academy at Yeongcheon - Yeongcheon, North Gyeongsang
Korea Naval Academy - Changwon, South Gyeongsang

Special National Universities of Science and Technology
GIST - Gwangju
KAIST - Daejeon
DGIST - Daegu
UNIST - Ulsan
Korea University of Science and Technology - Daejeon

National Universities of Education
The following national universities were established to train elementary teachers:
Busan National University of Education - Busan
Cheongju National University of Education - Cheongju, North Chungcheong
Chinju National University of Education - Jinju, South Gyeongsang
Chuncheon National University of Education - Chuncheon, Gangwon
Daegu National University of Education  - Daegu
Gongju National University of Education - Gongju, North Chungcheong
Gwangju National University of Education - Gwangju
Gyeongin National University of Education - Incheon
Jeonju National University of Education - Jeonju, North Jeolla
Seoul National University of Education - Seoul

National colleges
Korea National College of Agriculture and Fisheries - Jeonju, North Jeolla
Korea National University of Welfare - Pyeongtaek, Gyeonggi

Distance education
Korea National Open University - Seoul

Other Public Universities and Colleges in South Korea

University
University of Seoul - Seoul
The University of Seoul is only a municipal university in South Korea.

College
Chungnam Provincial College - Cheongyang County, South Chungcheong
Chungbuk Provincial College - Okcheon County, North Chungcheong
Gangwon Provincial University - Gangneung, Gangwon
Gyeongbuk Provincial College - Yecheon County, North Gyeongsang 
Gyeongnam Provincial Geochang College - Geochang County, South Gyeongsang
Gyeongnam Provincial Namhae College - Namhae County, South Gyeongsang
Jeonnam Provincial College – Damyang County and Jangheung County, South Jeolla

See also
List of universities and colleges in South Korea
Education in Korea

References

External links 
 
 List of institutions at South Korean Ministry of Education

 
National